Marcus Bourne Huish (25 November 1843 – 4 May 1921) was an English barrister, writer and art dealer.

He was the son of Marcus Huish of Castle Donington and his wife Margaret Jane Bourne.  His mother died in 1847 and in 1849 his father remarried Frances Sarah Darwin, daughter of Sir Francis Sacheverel Darwin. Bourne was the editor of The Art Journal from 1881 to 1892 and was the first Managing Director of the Fine Art Society. He was a Japanophile and was given the honour of Chevalier of the Order of the Sacred Treasure. He was the Honorary Librarian of the Japan Society of the UK.

Books

References

External links
 Biography for: Marcus Bourne Huish at www.whistler.arts.gla.ac.uk
 https://web.archive.org/web/20060329044242/http://www.columbia.edu/cu/cup/catalog/data/071030/0710309163.HTM
 
 

1843 births
1921 deaths
English art collectors
Collectors of Asian art
English barristers
19th-century English people
English orientalists
People from Castle Donington